The University Park Campus School is a public school in the Main South neighborhood of Worcester, Massachusetts, United States. It educates 239 students in grades 712 as of 201718. Opened in 1997, the school is operated by a partnership between nearby Clark University and Worcester Public Schools. In March 2010, Massachusetts Governor Deval Patrick visited the school to promote educational reform.

References

External links
 
 Missing the mark Worcester Magazine, January 5, 2011

Clark University
High schools in Worcester, Massachusetts
Educational institutions established in 1997
Public high schools in Massachusetts
1997 establishments in Massachusetts